Menschel is a surname. Notable people with the surname include:

Richard Menschel (born c. 1935), American investment banker, art collector and philanthropist
Robert Menschel (born c. 1930), American investment banker and philanthropist
Ronay A. Menschel (born c. 1942), American politician